"Play No Games" is a song by American rapper Big Sean from his third studio album Dark Sky Paradise (2015). It features American singers Chris Brown and Ty Dolla Sign with production handled by Key Wane and Jay John Henry. "Play No Games" also samples Guy's 1988 hit single "Piece of My Love." "Play No Games" was sent to US urban contemporary radio on September 22, 2015, as the album's fifth official single. The song peaked at number eight on the Billboard R&B/Hip-Hop Airplay chart while peaking at number 84 and number 28 on the Billboard Hot 100 and the Billboard Hot R&B/Hip-Hop Songs charts, respectively.

Music video
Directed by Mike Carson and inspired by the popular sitcom Martin, the music video for "Play No Games" premiered at the BET Awards on June 28, 2015 and features French Montana, Sevyn Streeter, Reginald Ballard (in character as Bruh Man) singing Ty Dolla Sign's vocals, along with an appearance by the sitcom's title character, Martin Lawrence.

Charts

Certifications

References

External links
 

2014 songs
Big Sean songs
Chris Brown songs
Songs written by Big Sean
Songs written by Chris Brown
Songs written by Ty Dolla Sign
Songs written by Timmy Gatling
Songs written by Aaron Hall (singer)
Songs written by Teddy Riley